David Rubenstein (born October 2, 1957) was the founding Executive Director for the Save Darfur Coalition. He helped develop a 182-member coalition to end violence and reduce the suffering in Darfur.

Biography and education
David received a Bachelor of Arts in Economics from Washington University in St. Louis. He graduated in 1981.

Work experience
He has worked with MCI Telecommunications, Green Seal Inc., EnvironMentors Project, Thoughtful Action Group and the Save Darfur Coalition. He is currently the Executive Director for the Best Shot Foundation.

Save Darfur Coalition
The Save Darfur Coalition is a U.S.-based advocacy group calling for international intervention in the Darfur conflict in the Eastern African state of Sudan. It is a coalition of religious, political, and human rights organizations designed to campaign for a response to the genocidal actions taken by the three Sudanese federal states that make up the region of Darfur.

Nicholas Kristof of the New York Times said: "I didn’t emphasize it enough in the column, but the leadership of the group behind the diplomatic initiative—the Save Darfur Coalition—gets enormous credit. Dave Rubenstein, who founded it and runs it, has managed to hold together a group that runs from liberal New Yorkers to evangelical Christian Texans, from Jews to Christians to Muslims. In a polarized world, that is a real achievement—and one reason for the group’s influence.”

Best Shot Foundation
The Best Shot Foundation focuses global awareness and political engagement on childhood pneumonia. Best Shot Foundation believes that increased public commitment will drive increased health resource allocation to ensure that children stop dying from pneumonia, a preventable and easily treatable disease. 

The Best Shot Foundation is organizing dodgeball tournaments on college campuses across the country to raise awareness and funds for the fight against pneumonia. Each team competes for a chance to advance to the national Pnock Out Pneumonia Championship. Each dollar raised brings critical prevention and treatment services to those children most in need. Pnock Out Pneumonia is part of a global movement to bring greater attention to this deadly disease. This November 2, pneumonia advocates around the world will come together to commemorate the first-ever World Pneumonia Day.

Awards
 Peace and Justice Award, Center for African Peace and Conflict Resolution at California State University, Sacramento, 2007
 Alumnus of the Year, Leadership Washington, 2001
 AT&T Environmental Achievement Award, 2000 (EnvironMentors)
 Washingtonian of the Year, Washingtonian Magazine, 1999

References

External links
 World Pneumonia Day
 Best Shot Foundation
 Save Darfur Coalition

American activists
Living people
1957 births
Washington University in St. Louis alumni